Boris Neveu (born 12 April 1986) is a French slalom canoeist who has competed at the international level since 2004.

Biography
Neveu won 14 medals at the ICF Canoe Slalom World Championships with five golds (K1: 2014, 2021; K1 team: 2006, 2014, 2021), six silvers (K1: 2009, K1 team: 2010, 2011, 2017, Extreme K1: 2017, 2018) and three bronzes (K1: 2022, K1 team: 2013, 2022). He also won eight medals at the European Championships (3 golds, 3 silvers and 2 bronzes).

Neveu finished 4th in the overall World Cup standings twice (2015, 2019), and 5th twice (2014, 2021). He finished the 2015 season as the World No. 1 in the K1 event.

He finished 7th in the K1 event at the 2020 Summer Olympics in Tokyo.

World Cup individual podiums

1 World Championship counting for World Cup points

References

2010 ICF Canoe Slalom World Championships 12 September 2010 K1 men's team final results – accessed 12 September 2010.
13 September 2009 final results of the men's K1 event at the 2009 ICF Canoe Slalom World Championships. – accessed 13 September 2009.
ICF medalists for Olympic and World Championships – Part 2: rest of flatwater (now sprint) and remaining canoeing disciplines: 1936–2007.

External links

French male canoeists
Living people
1986 births
Medalists at the ICF Canoe Slalom World Championships
People from Lourdes
Canoeists at the 2020 Summer Olympics
Olympic canoeists of France
Sportspeople from Hautes-Pyrénées